Shepard is a planned and approved CTrain suburban light rail station in Calgary, Alberta, Canada part of the Green Line. Construction will begin in 2022 and complete in 2027 as part of construction stage one, segment one. The station is located at the South Trail Crossing shopping centre and will serve as the southern terminus station for stage one of construction. It is expected to be one of the busiest stations on opening day.

This station is surrounded by a commercial and retail area and does not currently have a pedestrian-friendly environment. As part of station construction, the area will be upgraded with improved sidewalks and multi-use pathways that will increase walkability in the area. The improved pathway system will feature a pedestrian connection to Douglasdale/Douglasglen. The Green Line light-rail storage and maintenance facility will be immediately north of the station. Additionally, it will feature a large park and ride, and a one-million square foot office development has been planned adjacent to the station.

References 

CTrain stations
Railway stations scheduled to open in 2027